A visible file, sometimes just called a kardex, after a prominent purveyor, is a filing system for overlapping cards fixed in shallow drawers.

The best-known version was commercialized by Kardex.

The Library Bureau company commercialized the very similar L. B. Speedac.

Another brand was the Index Visible System.

Notes

Office equipment